The 2017 Mid-American Conference men's basketball tournament is a post-season basketball tournament for the Mid-American Conference (MAC). Tournament first-round games were held on campus sites at the higher seed on March 6. The remaining rounds here held at Quicken Loans Arena in Cleveland, Ohio between March 9–11, 2017. The sixth-seeded Kent State Golden Flashes won the tournament and the conference's automatic bid to the 2017 NCAA Division I men's basketball tournament with a 70–65 win over the top-seeded Akron Zips. It is Kent State's sixth tournament title overall and first since 2008. Kent State lost to UCLA in the First Round.

Seeds
All 12 MAC teams participated in the tournament. Teams were seeded by record within the conference, with a tiebreaker system to seed teams with identical conference records. The top four teams received a bye to quarterfinals.

Schedule

Bracket

* denotes overtime period

All-Tournament Team
Tournament MVP – Jason Preston, Kent State

See also
2017 MAC women's basketball tournament

References

Mid-American Conference men's basketball tournament
Tournament
MAC men's basketball tournament
MAC men's basketball tournament
Basketball competitions in Cleveland
College baseball tournaments in Ohio